Tiziana Beghin (born 4 February 1971, in Genoa) is an Italian politician who was elected as a Member of the European Parliament in 2014 and re-confirmed in 2019.

References

1971 births
Living people
MEPs for Italy 2014–2019
MEPs for Italy 2019–2024
21st-century women MEPs for Italy
Five Star Movement MEPs
Politicians from Genoa